Capital FM launched in 2013 by a team led by Jamal Hassim, a Malaysia-based media entrepreneur, together with a group of influential investors. Its headquarters and studios were uniquely located in the Concord Hotel Atrium in downtown Kuala Lumpur. It was a radio network that pitched programming for listeners in the Klang Valley, the first Malaysian urban focused station.  It then merged with the Rediffusion Group and the network was then repositioned to address urban female listeners and marketed as the destination of choice for stylish, thinking women, target 25–34 years old, living in the city and other urban areas in Malaysia.

Capital FM was Malaysia's only women-centric radio station before the station stopped broadcasting. Capital FM was the first and only English radio station in Malaysia dedicated to women, the perfect platform and sounding board for women to air their views and share their thoughts. Recognising the multi-faceted and multilayered nature of women, the station offered a myriad of content ranging from current issues to more light hearted lifestyle related content.

Starting from 1 October 2015, the radio station would still remain active, albeit with the lack of radio shows and the public service announcements, news and traffic reports are unaffected. All of these has since stopped after the acquisition of Astro Radio.

Capital FM holds a Content Applications Service Provider Individual (CASP) licence to enabling it the ability to broadcast without any DJs alongside its sister radio station, Red FM.

On 9 September 2016, Astro announced plans to acquire both Red FM and Capital FM from Star Radio for RM42 million. Astro intends to rebrand and broadcast these two radio stations via on-air and online platforms after acquisition. The acquisition was completed on 30 December 2016 and these stations are now owned by Astro Radio and no longer branded as such. As of 1 February 2017 to 1 October 2017, these stations are broadcasting test transmissions for the upcoming rebrand soon.

On 2 October 2017, it was replaced with GoXuan while Red FM was replaced with Zayan.

Frequency 

The radio also can be accessed in South Perak (Bidor, Slim River, Sungkai, Tanjung Malim, Tapah, and Teluk Intan), West Pahang (Bentong, Genting Highlands, Karak, Mentakab, Raub, and Temerloh), and North Negeri Sembilan (Mantin, Nilai and parts of Seremban) on the Klang Valley frequency 88.9 FM, while South Kedah (Bandar Baharu, Kulim, and Sungai Petani), and North Perak (Bagan Serai, Bukit Merah, Kamunting, Parit Buntar, and parts of Taiping) can be accessed on the Penang frequency 107.6 FM.

Astro's GoXuan (radio station) has been occupying the frequencies.

References

External links

Klang Valley
2011 establishments in Malaysia
2015 disestablishments in Malaysia
Radio stations established in 2011
Radio stations disestablished in 2015
Radio stations in Malaysia
Mass media in Kuala Lumpur